Kutaisi is one of the oldest continuously inhabited cities in the world and the third-most populous city in Georgia after Tbilisi and Batumi.

Historically one of the major cities of Georgia, it served as political center of Colchis in the Middle Ages as capital of the Kingdom of Abkhazia and Kingdom of Georgia and later as the capital of the Kingdom of Imereti. From October 2012 to December 2018, Kutaisi was the seat of the Parliament of Georgia as an effort to decentralise the Georgian government.

History
Archaeological evidence indicates that the city functioned as the capital of the Colchis in the sixth to fifth centuries BC. It is believed that, in Argonautica, a Greek epic poem about Jason and the Argonauts and their journey to Colchis, author Apollonius Rhodius considered Kutaisi their final destination as well as the residence of King Aeëtes.

Later, it was the capital of the kingdom of Lazica until being occupied briefly by the Arabs. An Arab incursion into western Georgia was repelled by Abkhazians jointly with Lazic and Iberian allies in 736, towards c.786, Leon II won his full independence from Byzantine and transferred his capital to Kutaisi, thus unifying Lazica and Abasgia via a dynastic union. The latter led the unification of the Georgian monarchy in the 11th century.

From 1008 to 1122, Kutaisi served as the capital of the United Kingdom of Georgia, and, from the 15th century until 1810, it was the capital of the Imeretian Kingdom. In 1508, the city was conquered by Selim I, who was the son of Bayezid II, the sultan of the Ottoman Empire.

During the 17th century, Imeretian kings made many appeals to Russian Empire to help them in their struggle for independence from the Ottomans. All these appeals were ignored as Russia did not want to spoil relations with Turkey. Only in the reign of Catherine the Great, in 1768, were troops of general Gottlieb Heinrich Totleben sent to join the forces of King Heraclius II of Georgia, who hoped to reconquer the Ottoman-held southern Georgian lands, with Russian help. Totleben helped King Solomon I of Imereti to recover his capital, Kutaisi, on August 6, 1770.

Finally, the Russian-Turkish wars ended in 1810 with the annexation of the Imeretian Kingdom by the Russian Empire. The city was the administrative capital of the Kutais Uyezd and the larger Kutaisi Governorate, which included much of west Georgia. In March 1879, the city was the site of a blood libel trial that attracted attention all over Russia; the ten accused Jews were acquitted.

Kutaisi was a major industrial center before Georgia's independence on 9 April 1991. Independence was followed by the economic collapse of the country, and, as a result, many inhabitants of Kutaisi have had to work abroad. Small-scale trade prevails among the rest of the population.

In 2011, Mikheil Saakashvili, the president of Georgia, signed a constitutional amendment relocating the parliament to Kutaisi. On 26 May 2012, Saakashvili inaugurated the new Parliament building in Kutaisi. This was done in an effort to decentralise power and shift some political control closer to Abkhazia, although it has been criticised as marginalising the legislature, and also for the demolition of a Soviet War Memorial formerly at the new building's location. The subsequent government of the Georgian Dream passed a new constitution that moved the parliament back to Tbilisi, effective from January 2019.

Culture

Landmarks
The landmark of the city is the ruined Bagrati Cathedral, built by Bagrat III, king of Georgia, in the early 11th century. The Gelati Monastery a few km east of the city, is a UNESCO World Heritage Site. One of the famous churches in Georgia is Motsameta monastery. It is named after two saints, brothers David and Constantine. They were the Dukes of Margveti, and were martyred by Arab invaders in the 8th  century. Besides the churches, there are other places of note such as: Sataplia Cave, where one can observe footprints of dinosaurs; ruins of Geguti Palace, which was one of the residences of Georgian monarchs; "Okros Chardakhi" – Georgian Kings’ Palace; the Pantheon, where many notable citizens are buried; The Kutaisi Synagogue which was built in 1885.

Museums and other cultural institutions

Kutaisi State Historical Museum
Kutaisi Museum of Sport
Kutaisi Museum of Martial Art
Museum of Zakaria Paliashvili
Kutaisi State Historical Archive
Kutaisi State Scientific-Universal Library
Akaki Tsereteli State University

Theatres and cinema

Kutaisi Lado Meskhishvili State Academic Theatre
Kutaisi Meliton Balanchivadze State Opera House
Kutaisi Iakob Gogebashvili State Puppet Theatre
Cinema and Entertaining Center “Suliko”
Hermann-Wedekind-Jugendtheater

Education
Higher educational institutions in Kutaisi:
 Akaki Tsereteli State University
 Kutaisi International University
 Georgian State University of Subtropical Agriculture
 Kutaisi University (Unik)

 Cadets Military Lyceum of Georgia

Professional unions and public organizations
 Georgian Writers’ Union
 Georgian Painters’ Union
 Folk Palace

Media
Local newspapers include: Kutaisi, Imeretis Moabe, PS, Akhali Gazeti, and Kutaisuri Versia.  Other publications include Chveneburebi, a journal published by the Ministry of Diaspora Issues, and Gantiadi, a scientific journal.

TV: "Rioni"; Radio: "Dzveli Kalaki" (old City)

Also nearly all of Georgia's national-level newspapers, journals and television stations have their representatives in Kutaisi.

Geography

Kutaisi is located along both banks of the Rioni River. To the east and northeast, Kutaisi is bounded by the Northern Imereti Foothills, to the north by the Samgurali Range, and to the west and the south by the Colchis Plain.

Landscape
Kutaisi is surrounded by deciduous forests to the northeast and the northwest. The low-lying outskirts of the city have a largely agricultural landscape. The city center has many gardens and its streets are lined with high, leafy trees. In the springtime, when the snow starts to melt in the nearby mountains, the storming Rioni River in the middle of the city is heard far beyond its banks.

Climate
Kutaisi has a humid subtropical climate (Cfa) with a well-defined on-shore/monsoonal flow (characteristic of the Colchis Plain) during the autumn and winter months. The summers are generally hot and relatively dry while the winters are wet and cool.

Rain may fall in every season of the year. Kutaisi experiences powerful easterly winds in the summer which descend from the nearby mountains.

Population

Administrative division

There are 12 administrative units in Kutaisi:

Avtokarkhana
Gamarjveba
Gumati
Vakisubani
Kakhianouri
Mukhnari
Nikea
Sapichkhia
Sulkhan-Saba
Ukimerioni
City-museum
Dzelkviani

Government

Mayor

The most recent mayoral election was held on 2 October 2021, with a runoff held on 30 October, and the results were as follows:

List of elected mayors of Kutaisi 

 Ioseb Khakhaleishvili (GD) (2020–)
 Giorgi Chighvaria (GD) (2017–2020)
 Shota Murghulia (GD) (2014–2017)

City council

The Kutaisi city council (Sakrebulo) governs the city alongside the Mayor. The most recent city council election was held on October 2, 2021, and the results were as follows:

! colspan=2| Party
! Lead candidate
! Votes
! %
! +/-
! Seats
! +/-
|-
| bgcolor=#0D00B3| 
| align=left| Georgian Dream
| align=left| Dimitri Mkheidze
| 25,957
| 39.21
|  9.94
| 18
|  1
|-
| bgcolor=#e4012e| 
| align=left| United National Movement 
| align=left| Giga Shushania
| 24,893
| 37.60
|  14.23
| 14
|  10
|-
| bgcolor=#702F92| 
| align=left| For Georgia 
| align=left| Eleonora Archaia
| 4,440
| 6.71
| New
| 2
| New
|-
| bgcolor=#ff0000| 
| align=left| Strategy Aghmashenebeli
| align=left| Koba Guruli
| 2,168
| 3.28
|  0.64
| 1
|  1
|-
| colspan=9 bgcolor=lightgrey| 
|-
| bgcolor=#fad406| 
| align=left| Lelo
| align=left| Gia Gurgenidze
| 1,339
| 2.02
| New
| 0
| New
|-
| bgcolor=#16166b| 
| align=left| Labour Party
| align=left| Samson Gugava
| 1,130
| 1.71
|  2.05
| 0
| 
|-
| bgcolor=#327F37| 
| align=left| Girchi - More Freedom
| align=left| Dachi Dididze
| 1,073
| 1.62
| New
| 0
| New
|-
| bgcolor=#F2721D| 
| align=left|For the People
| align=left| Shota Chikovani
| 820
| 1.24
| New
| 0
| New
|-
| bgcolor=#e7b031| 
| align=left| Alliance of Patriots
| align=left| Nona Asatiani
| 804
| 1.21
|  2.68
| 0
| 
|-
| bgcolor=#003C7B| 
| align=left| European Georgia
| align=left| David Gogisvanidze
| 733
| 1.11
|  10.82
| 0
|  2
|-
! colspan=3| Total
! 68,486
! 100.0
! 
! 35
! ±10
|-
! colspan=3| Electorate/voter turnout
! 153,861
! 44.53 
!  0.81
! 
! 
|-
| colspan=8| Source: არჩევნების შედეგები
|}

Economy 

Kutaisi has traditionally been an important industrial center in Georgia, but after the collapse of the Soviet Union most of the old manufacturing lines either stopped working or had to greatly reduce their operations. Nevertheless, the city continues to be an important regional center for the greater Imereti area, acting as a commercial hub for the surrounding countryside. In recent years, the city has started attracting more investment from various multinational corporations.

The Auto Mechanical Plant, originally established in 1945, is located in Kutaisi.

There are two free industrial zones in Kutaisi: The Kutaisi free industrial zone (Kutaisi FIZ) and the Hualing free industrial zone (Hualing FIZ). The Kutaisi FIZ was created in 2009 and was established on the initiative of Fresh Electric, an Egypt-based home appliances producer. The Hualing FIZ operates since 2015, and specializes in wood and stone processing, furniture and mattress production and metal construction. Both of the free industrial zones offer multiple incentives to investors such as tax exemptions and reduced barriers for trade.

In 2019, German solar panel manufacturer AE Solar opened a new, fully automated manufacturing line in Kutaisi. With a total output of 500 MW per year it is the largest solar panel factory under one roof in Europe. During the same year Changan Automobile announced plans to construct an electric car factory in Kutaisi, with an annual production capacity of up to 40,000 vehicles. The company plans to export annually about 20,000 cars to the EU. The factory plans to employ about 3,000 people.

Sport
Kutaisi has a great tradition in sports, with many famous sports clubs. FC Torpedo Kutaisi has participated on the highest level of the Soviet Union football league. After Georgia achieved independence, it won many domestic and international titles. RC AIA Kutaisi won the Soviet Championship several times in rugby, and after independence, national championships and cups. The women's football club FC Martve takes part at the 2017–18 UEFA Women's Champions League qualifying round after becoming champion in the Georgia women's football championship in 2016. Kutaisi also has an influential basketball club BC Kutaisi 2010, 2016 Champion of the Georgian Superliga, which plays its home games at the Kutaisi Sport Palas.

Transport

Airport

It is one of three international airports currently in operation in Georgia.

Railway
Kutaisi has two main railway stations, along with multiple smaller ones. Direct inter-city, as well as suburban railway services, are provided to Tbilisi (Central) and other major cities across the country. The rail operator on all lines is Georgian Railways.

Local celebrations

Kutaisoba is the most important holiday in Kutaisi. It is celebrated on 2 May. On this day the population of Kutaisi crowds into the central park, with their children and celebrate together.    

Some people make masks and there are many kinds of performances. Also, children sell chamomiles. It is an old tradition, in the past ladies collected money for poor people, so today children also collect money for them.

On Kutaisoba one can see traditional Georgian dances and can hear folk music. Also, it is an old tradition to go to the forest, which is near Kutaisi. Families barbecue and play games. On this day, people wear traditional clothes, choxa.  There is a tradition of writing lyrics that have been written by writers from Kutaisi, and then airplanes throw them from the sky. There is also a competition in different kinds of martial arts.

Notable natives

Aeëtes – King of Kingdom of Colchis
Bagrat III – King of united Kingdom of Georgia in 975–1014
George I – King of united Kingdom of Georgia in 1014–1027
Bagrat IV – King of united Kingdom of Georgia in 1027–1072
George II – King of united Kingdom of Georgia in 1072–1089
David IV – King of united Kingdom of Georgia in 1089–1125
Veriko Anjaparidze – Georgian actress
Revaz Gabriadze – cinematographer, writer, director, production designer
Niko Nikoladze (1843–1928) – Georgian public figure
Meliton Balanchivadze (1862–1937) – Georgian composer
Zakaria Paliashvili (1871–1933) – Georgian composer
Iakob Nikoladze (1876–1951) – Georgian sculptor, designer of the previous state flag of Georgia.
Władysław Raczkiewicz (1885–1947) – the first president of the Polish government-in-exile, 1939–1947
Joseph Orbeli (1887–1961) – orientalist
David Kakabadze (1889–1952) – Georgian painter
Victor Dolidze (1890–1933) – Georgian composer
Petre Otskheli (1907–1937) Georgian modernist set and costume designer
Otar Korkia (1923–2005) – Georgian basketball player and coach (Olympic silver medalist)
Dodo Chichinadze (1924–2009) – Georgian actress
Revaz Dzodzuashvili (b. 1945) – Georgian football player, World Cup 1966 bronze medalist
Zurab Sakandelidze (b. 1945) – Georgian basketball player, Olympic champion
Mikheil Korkia (b. 1948) – Georgian basketball player, Olympic champion
Meir Pichhadze (1955–2010) – Israeli painter, Kutaisi native
Tengiz Sulakvelidze (b. 1956) – Georgian football player, played in 1982 FIFA World Cup, Euro 1988 silver medalist
Ramaz Shengelia (1957–2012) – Georgian football player, played in 1982 FIFA World Cup
Maia Chiburdanidze (b. 1961) – the seventh Women's World Chess Champion
Besik Khamashuridze (b. 1977) – Georgian rugby player, won 53 caps, RC Aia Kutaisi player-coach
David Khakhaleishvili (b. 1971) – Olympic champion in Wrestling
Davit Aslanadze (b.1976) – Football player
Katie Melua (b. 1984) – A Georgian-British singer and songwriter that was born and grew up here.
Nika Sichinava (b. 1994) – Georgian football player, played for Yunist Chernihiv and FC Inhulets Petrove.

International relations

Twin towns – sister cities

Kutaisi is twinned with:

 Ashkelon, Israel
 Columbia, United States
 Dnipro, Ukraine
 Ganja, Azerbaijan
 Gomel, Belarus
 Karşıyaka, Turkey
 Kharkiv, Ukraine
 Laiwu (Jinan), China
 Lviv, Ukraine
 Mykolaiv, Ukraine
 Nanchang, China
 Newport, Wales, UK
 Poznań, Poland
 Sumy, Ukraine
 Szombathely, Hungary
 Ungheni, Moldova
 Valka, Latvia
 Zhytomyr, Ukraine

Cooperation agreements
Kutaisi has cooperation agreements with:
  Kaunas, Lithuania
  Maribor, Slovenia
  Tartu, Estonia

See also
 Colchis
 Imereti
 The Forest Song

Explanatory notes

References

External links 

 Newport Kutaisi Twinning Association
 

 
Archaeological sites in Georgia (country)
Cities and towns in Imereti
Kutaisi Governorate
Self-governing cities in Georgia (country)